This was a new event to the ITF Women's Circuit.

Marina Melnikova and Laura Pous Tió won the inaugural event, defeating Sofia Shapatava and Anastasiya Vasylyeva in the final, 6–4, 6–4.

Seeds

Draw

References 
 Draw

Bursa Cup - Doubles
2015 Doubles